Rayyan Baniya (born 18 February 1999) is an Italian football player who plays as a defender for Turkish club Fatih Karagümrük.

Club career

Verona
He joined the Under-19 squad of Verona before the 2016–17 season. He did not receive any call-ups to the senior squad in 2016–17 and 2017–18 seasons. He spent the 2018–19 season on loan at Serie D side Mantova. On 29 June 2019 he signed his first professional contract with Verona for a 3-year term.

Loan to Renate
On 17 July 2019 he joined Serie C club Renate on loan.

He made his professional Serie C debut for Renate on 25 August 2019 in a game against Giana Erminio. He started the game and played the whole match.

Second loan to Mantova
On 1 September 2020 he returned to Mantova, this time in Serie C.

Fatih Karagümrük
On 22 June 2021, he signed with Fatih Karagümrük in Turkey.

Personal life
Born in Italy, Baniya was born to a Beninese father and Turkish mother. He holds Italian and Turkish passports.

References

External links
 

1999 births
Living people
Footballers from Bologna
Italian footballers
Italian people of Beninese descent
Italian people of Turkish descent
Italian sportspeople of African descent
Association football defenders
Mantova 1911 players
A.C. Renate players
Fatih Karagümrük S.K. footballers
Serie C players
Serie D players
Süper Lig players
Italian expatriate footballers
Expatriate footballers in Turkey